William ("Bill" or "Billy") Straub (born in Philadelphia, Pennsylvania) is a former U.S. soccer player.  He spent five seasons in the North American Soccer League.  He also earned three caps with the United States in 1975.

College
Straub attended the University of Pennsylvania where he played on the men's soccer team from 1970 to 1972.  He was a third team All-American in 1972.  In 2005, he was named to the University of Pennsylvania All Century soccer team.

NASL
In 1973, Straub was drafted by the Montreal Olympique.  After only six games, the Olympique traded him to the expansion Philadelphia Atoms.  He did not play a game with the Atoms until the championship game.  In that game, he replaced Jim Fryatt, who had been on loan from English team Southport F.C. at forward when Southport recalled Fryatt.  Straub went on to score the second goal of the Atoms' 2–0 win with an 85th-minute header, to secure the 1973 NASL championship.  He missed the entire 1977 season with injuries, but came back in 1978 to play twenty-five games in the Atoms back line.  The Atoms folded at the end of the 1976 season.  In 1978, he was signed by the expansion Philadelphia Fury.  After one season with the Fury, he retired in 1979.

National team
Straub earned three caps with the United States men's national soccer team at the 1975 Mexico City Cup.  On August 19, 1975, he played his first game with the U.S. in a 3-1 loss to Costa Rica.  Two days later, the U.S. lost, 6-0, to Argentina.  His last game was a 2-0 loss to Mexico on August 24.  While he started and played every minute of the first two games, in the third game, he came on for Archie Roboostoff in the 87th minute.

References

External links
 
 Atoms register
 NASL stats

1957 births
Living people
American soccer players
American expatriate soccer players
Expatriate soccer players in Canada
American expatriate sportspeople in Canada
Association football defenders
North American Soccer League (1968–1984) players
Montreal Olympique players
Philadelphia Atoms players
Philadelphia Fury (1978–1980) players
United States men's international soccer players
Soccer players from Philadelphia